Oakley was a railway station on the West of England Main Line in Hampshire, England which served the village of Oakley.

History
The station was opened on 3 July 1854 by the London & South Western Railway. It closed on 17 June 1963.

References

External links
 Oakley station on navigable 1947 O. S. map

Disused railway stations in Hampshire
Former London and South Western Railway stations
Railway stations in Great Britain opened in 1854
Railway stations in Great Britain closed in 1963
Beeching closures in England